Saket Kushwaha is an Indian educationist and agricultural economist. He is the vice chancellor (VC) of Rajiv Gandhi University, Arunachal Pradesh and former VC of Lalit Narayan Mithila University, Bihar. He is a professor of agricultural economics at the Banaras Hindu University, on lien.

Early life and education 
Kushwaha was born on 28 August 1963 in Bhimsen, Kanpur, Uttar Pradesh, India. His father, Surendra Singh Kushwaha, was professor in the physics department of Banaras Hindu University and also served as VC of Ranchi University, Jharkhand and Mahatma Gandhi Kashi Vidyapith, Uttar Pradesh. Saket Kushwaha has B.Sc in Agriculture (1983) and an M.Sc. (1986) and Ph.D. (1992) in Agricultural Economics from Banaras Hindu University.

Career 
Kushwaha has served as the dean of the School of Management at Federal University of Technology Bauchi, Nigeria from 1993 to 2006. In 2006 he joined as professor at Banaras Hindu University. In 2014 he was appointed VC of  Lalit Narayan Mithila University where he served until 2017. From 2017 to 2018 he served as professor-in-charge for Rajiv Gandhi South Campus Banaras Hindu University. In 2018 he was appointed VC of Rajiv Gandhi University.

References

Indian academic administrators
Banaras Hindu University people
Living people
1963 births
Indian agricultural economists